Cimatron is an Israeli software company that produces CAD/CAM software for manufacturing, toolmaking and CNC programming applications.

The company was listed on the Nasdaq exchange under the symbol CIMT, until its 2014 acquisition by 3D Systems. Prior to this, the company's major shareholder was DBSI, whose co-managing partner, Yossi Ben-Shalom, chaired the Cimatron board.

Headquartered in Tel Aviv, the company had subsidiaries in the United States, Germany, Italy, China, South Korea, India and Brazil, as well as resellers in over 40 countries. Its main software products, CimatronE and GibbsCAM, continue to be used in over 40,000 installations worldwide. Its clients are largely from the automotive, aerospace, consumer electronics, toys, medical, optics and telecom industries.

One of the company's major clients is China's Haier Mould, a subsidiary of the Haier Group.

History
The company was founded in 1982 as MicroCAD, releasing its first software products Multicadd and Multicam in 1984 for use by small- to medium-sized tool shops. In 1987 the company changed its name to Cimatron.

In 1990, the company launched Cimatron IT, which it claimed was the world's first integrated CAD/CAM software.

In March 1996, Cimatron began trading on the Nasdaq under the symbol CIMT. In 1999 Cimatron launched its product for Windows, CimatronE. In March 2011, Cimatron began trading on the Tel-Aviv Stock Exchange, becoming a dual-listed company. However, in 2013 its board of directors voted to delist from the TASE.

In July 2005, Cimatron acquired an initial 27.5% interest in Microsystem  Srl, its Italian distributor. By July 2008, Cimatron had completed the acquisition of 100% of Microsystem.

In January 2008, Cimatron merged with US CNC machining software company Gibbs and Associates. Former Gibbs head William Gibbs assumed the position of Cimatron President North America and Vice Chairman of Cimatron Ltd. and agreed to remain with the company for at least five years.

In 2010, Cimatron was listed by PLM consulting firm CIMdata as one of the leading suppliers of CAM software based on CAM software and services direct revenue received. CIMdata also predicted that Cimatron would be one of the five most rapidly growing CAM software companies in 2011.

In the 4th quarter of 2010, Cimatron reported its highest ever quarterly revenue of $11 million and operating profit of $1.7 million. Also Cimatron and LEDAS (LGS 3D owner those days) have collaborated on Motion Simulation application dedicated to mold, tool and die maker design, that is able to work with standard CAD shapes, i.e. canonics and NURBS. Collision detection was based on functions of ACIS kernel, while motion itself was performed by LGS 3D as a sequence of constraint satisfaction problems. As a result of collaboration, Cimatron licensed LGS 3D, and Motion Simulation application was developed and integrated into CimatronE CAM system.

In 2011, the company was listed as one of Israel's fastest growing technology companies in the Deloitte Fast 50 Awards' list.

For 2012 Cimatron reported revenues of $42.3 million, with a record non-GAAP operating profit of $6.1 million.

In February 2013, Cimatron CEO Danny Haran announced that the company had begun researching the additive manufacturing field. In March of that year Cimatron established a 3D Printing Advisory board, naming 3D printing expert Terry Wohlers as its first member.

In 2015, 3D Systems completed its acquisition of all shares of Cimatron Ltd. for approximately $97 million.

Products

CimatronE
CimatronE is an integrated CAD/CAM solution for mold, die and tool makers and manufacturers of discrete parts, providing associativity across the manufacturing process from quoting, through design and delivery. The solution's products include mold design, electrode design, die design, 2.5 to 5-axis numerical control (NC) programming and 5-axis discrete part production. In 2010 the CimatronE SuperBox was launched, a combined hardware-software device for the offloading and acceleration of toolpath calculations in NC programming.

GibbsCAM
GibbsCAM specializes in 2- through 5-axis milling, turning, mill/turning, multi-task simultaneous machining and wire-EDM. It also provides integrated manufacturing modeling, including 2D, 2.5D, 3D wireframe, surface and solid modeling.

References

External links

Computer-aided design software
Computer-aided manufacturing software
Companies established in 1982
Product lifecycle management
Software companies of Israel
Companies formerly listed on the Nasdaq
Engineering software companies
Computer-aided engineering software
1982 establishments in Israel